Boyd Clay (May 6, 1915 – June 22, 1978) was an American football tackle. He played for the Cleveland Rams from 1940 to 1944.

References

1915 births
1978 deaths
People from Hohenwald, Tennessee
Players of American football from Tennessee
American football tackles
Tennessee Volunteers football players
Cleveland Rams players